Peter Brathwaite FRSA is a British baritone opera singer, broadcaster, music columnist for a selection of United Kingdom newspapers, and a developer of music programming. He is also known for his recreations of Black portraits in art as part of the Getty Museum online "challenge" for re-creation of art works, begun in 2020 during the COVID-19 pandemic.

Education and background

Brathwaite's mother, a nurse, emigrated from Barbados to England to work for the National Health Service. Born in Manchester, Brathwaite was educated at Bury Grammar School, a private school for boys in the market town of Bury in Greater Manchester. From the age of eight he sang as a boy treble in the choir of St Ann’s Church, Manchester. In his teens he sang with The National Youth Choirs of Great Britain. He was a gap year choral scholar at Truro Cathedral. Brathwaite earned a first in Fine Art and Philosophy at Newcastle University. He received his master’s from the Royal College of Music postgraduate vocal studies course, before completing the Artist Diploma in Opera at the Royal College of Music International Opera School. After the Royal College, he trained at the Flanders Opera Studio, Ghent.

He is distantly related to the Barbadian poet and academic Edward Kamau Brathwaite. His ancestor Richard Brathwaite coined the term “computer”.

Performance 
In the UK, Brathwaite has sung for companies including The Royal Opera, English National Opera, Glyndebourne, Opera North, English Touring Opera, Opera Holland Park and Edinburgh International Festival. Outside the UK he has sung for La Monnaie, Munich Biennale, Nederlandse Reisopera, Opéra de Lyon, Danish National Opera and at the Hamburg Elbphilharmonie, Philharmonie de Paris and Philharmonie Luxembourg.

In 2018, he developed the show Effigies of Wickedness (Songs banned by the Nazis) in collaboration with English National Opera and the Gate Theatre. The cabaret-style show explored the Weimar era music banned by the Nazi regime. He has also given recitals using the works of the Entartete Musik ("degenerate music") exhibition. Brathwaite made his Royal Opera debut in 2019 singing various roles in the world premiere of Jules Maxwell’s The Lost Thing. The following season, he returned to the Royal Opera House Covent Garden for his main stage debut singing the role of Martin Carter in Hannah Kendall’s one man opera The Knife of Dawn. In 2021, he created the role of Joey in the world premiere of Kris Defoort’s opera The Time of Our Singing for La Monnaie, Brussels. Brathwaite created the role of Narrator in Wolf Witch Giant Fairy, a devised collaboration between The Royal Opera and Little Bulb. The show ran in the Royal Opera House's Linbury Theatre from December 2021 to January 2022. Wolf Witch Giant Fairy won the 2022 Laurence Olivier Award for Best Family Show. In May 2022, Brathwaite made his debut at the Munich Biennale singing the role of Paul in the world premiere of Ann Cleare's opera The Little Lives with Ensemble Musikfabrik. In September 2022 he sang the role of Stubb in Netia Jones' realisation of Olga Neuwirth's The Outcast at the Philharmonie de Paris, with Matthias Pintscher conducting Ensemble intercontemporain and the Orchestre du Conservatoire de Paris.

Concert appearances have included Britten's Canticles at Leeds Lieder Festival with Mark Padmore, Iestyn Davies and Joseph Middleton, and Mozart arias with Tonu Kaljuste and the Estonian National Symphony Orchestra in Tallinn.

Brathwaite has been a guest lecturer at the music department of Goldsmiths, University of London.

Black portraiture

His series of photographs, Rediscovering Black Portraiture, began as part of the online Getty Museum Challenge to recreate works of art. He began the work because he saw few recreations using Black subjects. In a series of self-portraits, Brathwaite reimagined portraits of Black subjects in art history. He produced one recreated artwork each day for 50 days. His recreations use modern objects, and result in a commentary and re-portrayal of the subjects, especially of their presentation as servants or enslaved people.

Eleven of the works were exhibited on King’s College London’s Strand Campus in an exhibition entitled Visible Skin: Rediscovering the Renaissance through Black Portraiture. In a review of this show for The Times, Jade Cuttle noted: “These mirror images with their uncanny resemblances traverse space and time, spotlighting the black lives that have been silenced by the canon of western art, while also inviting us to interrogate the present.”

Brathwaite's recreation of Portrait of an African, attributed to Allan Ramsay, is featured in a film produced for the Royal Albert Memorial Museum exhibition In Plain Sight: Transatlantic Slavery & Devon.

Writing and broadcasting
He writes music and art-related columns for The Guardian and The Independent. Brathwaite has authored and narrated the BBC Radio 3 Time Travellers podcast. His BBC Radio 3 series Discovering Black Portraiture focuses on five of his portrait recreations. In October 2021, The Royal Opera House Covent Garden presented Storytelling in opera, a live panel discussion curated by Peter Brathwaite and featuring American tenor Lawrence Brownlee. Peter Brathwaite presented BBC Radio 3's Inside Music in December 2021. His audio essay series for BBC Radio 3, In Their Voices, on five singers from whom he has drawn inspiration, was shortlisted for the Royal Philharmonic Society award for storytelling.

Brathwaite's book Rediscovering Black Portraiture is due to be published in April 2023 by Getty Publications, the publishing arm of the J. Paul Getty Trust. The book collects more than fifty of his portrait recreations.

Awards and honours 
 2005: Churchill Fellowship. He was presented with the Winston Churchill Fellowship Medallion by Queen Elizabeth II at an investiture held at Buckingham Palace.
 2015: Elected a Fellow of the Royal Society of Arts
 2016: International Opera Awards bursary recipient
2021: Genesis Foundation Kickstart Fund recipient (Music)
2021: Shortlisted for a Royal Philharmonic Society Award
2022: One of 10 performers and devisers in Wolf Witch Giant Fairy — winner of the 2022 Laurence Olivier Award for Best Family Show

References

External links 

 Rediscovering Black Portraiture
"In Their Voices" at BBC Radio 3

Year of birth missing (living people)
Living people